Adrian Fulle (born April 25, 1972) is an American writer, director and producer.  He graduated from Columbia College, Chicago with a BA in Film and Video and first worked for The Walt Disney Company. He has produced work for companies such as Amazon Studios, Warner Bros., Sony, Intel, Adobe, DTS and many others.

Filmography

Film
The Ride (1996)
Three Days (1997)
Love 101 (2000)
Family Tree (2000)
The Room (2001)
Nines (2003)
Compton Cowboy (2004)
Mr. Jim (2005)
Finding Preet (2005)
Shiloh Falls (2007)
The Young Americans (2007)
The Longest Nap (2007)
The Undertaker (2007)
Pawnless Endgame (2009)
The Brazen Bull (2010)
Women (2010)
Drinking From The Well (2011)
Unknown Project (2013)
Choose Your Weapon (2014)
Intermission (2014)
Crossroads: Choices & Consequences (2015)
Media Wars (video game) (2015)

Television
Power Play (2004)
Vox Influx (2014)

References

External links
 

1972 births
Living people
American film directors